The 2009 Tour de France was the 96th edition of the Tour de France, one of cycling's Grand Tours. It started on 4 July in the principality of Monaco with a  individual time trial which included a section of the Circuit de Monaco. The race visited six countries:  Monaco, France, Spain, Andorra, Switzerland and Italy, and finished on 26 July on the Champs-Élysées in Paris.

There were seven mountain stages, three of which had mountaintop finishes, and one medium-mountain stage. The race had a team time trial for the first time since 2005, the shortest distance in individual time trials since 1967, and the first penultimate-day mountain stage in the Tour's history.

2007 winner Alberto Contador won the race by a margin of 4′11″, having won both a mountain and time trial stage. His  team also took the team classification. and supplied the initial third-place finisher, Lance Armstrong. Armstrong's achievement was later voided by the UCI in October 2012 following his non-dispute of a doping accusation by USADA, and fourth place Bradley Wiggins was promoted to the podium.  Andy Schleck, second overall, won the young riders' competition as he had the previous year. Franco Pellizotti originally won the polka dot jersey as the King of the Mountains, but had that result (along with all his 2009 results) stripped by the Court of Arbitration for Sport in 2011 due to his irregular values in the UCI's biological passport program detected in May 2010. and the King of the Mountains title was retroactively awarded to Egoi Martínez. Mark Cavendish won six stages, including the final stage on the Champs-Élysées, but was beaten in the points classification by Thor Hushovd, who consequently won the green jersey.

Teams

20 teams were invited to take part in the race. Each team started with 9 riders, making a total of 180 participants, of whom 156 finished.

The teams entering the race were:

UCI ProTour teams

Invited teams

Pre-race favourites
Favourites for the race included 2008 winner Carlos Sastre, 2007 winner Alberto Contador, 2009 Giro d'Italia winner Denis Menchov and two time runner-up Cadel Evans. Lance Armstrong came out of retirement and competed in the race on the same team as Contador. Menchov and Evans performed far below the levels expected of them, finishing 51st and 30th respectively, and Sastre only showed briefly among the leaders on the mountain stages that would have provided his best chance of making a bid for victory, coming 17th overall.

He had finished in the top ten of the general classification of the Tour in the two previous years and was considered one of the favourites for overall victory.

News about a positive retest of a 2007 out-of-competition control concerning Thomas Dekker broke three days before the start; his team  immediately withdrew him from the starting list.

Route and stages

Race overview

The race started in Monaco with a  individual time trial, won by Olympic time trial champion Fabian Cancellara, who retained the yellow jersey as leader of the general classification throughout the first week, which was dominated by stages suited primarily to sprinters, with Mark Cavendish establishing himself as the strongest finisher. The significant action of the first week in relation to the overall classification was restricted to a split in the field on stage 3, and a team time trial the following day.

The second weekend saw the Tour in the Pyrenees, and the first attack on the field by eventual winner Alberto Contador, while the leadership was taken over by Rinaldo Nocentini. Thor Hushovd showed an ability to take points in stages that did not include flat sprint finishes that would be key to the contest for the points classification, and the main contenders for the mountains classification emerged. The journey towards the Alps the following week had a second pair of successive stage wins for Cavendish and a series of wins from riders in breakaways that held no threat to the general classification. An infringement in the sprint finish to stage 14 saw Cavendish relegated in finishing position, and Hushovd gaining the upper hand in the points classification.

The first alpine stage was the occasion of Contador's assumption of the race leadership, and the emergence of Andy Schleck as the only rider likely to challenge him in the mountains, and as the top young rider, giving Schleck the right to wear the white jersey. Franco Pellizotti focussed on collecting points on the climbs early in stages to overhaul Egoi Martínez in the race for the mountains classification, without threatening the race leaders. By the end of the three stages in the Alps, and after Contador's victory in the final time trial, it was only the minor placings that were realistically under question in the last mountain stage, held for the first time on the penultimate day of the tour on Mont Ventoux.

The UCI introduced a ban on radio communication between team management and riders on stage 10, but the riders responded with a conservative style of racing for most of the stage and the intended repetition of the experiment on stage 13 was abandoned.

Mark Cavendish claimed his sixth Champs-Élysées stage win on the final day of the Tour. At the victory ceremony, the national anthem of Denmark was mistakenly played instead of that of Spain. At the victory ceremony for teams, the anthem of Spain was yet played, because Contador was part of the winning team, Astana.

Doping
In the 2009 Tour, Doping controls were conducted by the UCI, with the French body AFLD shadowing the process. Officials targeted top riders like Lance Armstrong and Alberto Contador with an unprecedented number of tests.  While the Armstrong-Contador conflict ruled the headlines, reporting on doping rather took a back seat during the race. The news that Giro runner-up Danilo Di Luca had a positive A probe in the Giro did not change that. Five days after the race finished the UCI announced that the initial Stage 16 winner Mikel Astarloza tested positive for EPO in an out-of-competition test on 26 June, eight days before the race started. Later, Astarloza was removed from the results, and the stage win transferred to Sandy Casar.

Just days before the 2010 Giro d'Italia, 2009 Giro podium finisher and King of the Mountains winner in this Tour Franco Pellizotti was announced by the UCI as a rider of interest in their biological passport program. He was sidelined by his team, and did not race again in 2010. The case was not fully resolved until March 2011, at which time the Court of Arbitration for Sport ordered Pellizotti banned for two years, to pay a fine and court costs, and have all his 2009 results vacated.

In October 2012, Lance Armstrong had all his results post 1998, including the 2009 Tour, voided by the UCI following the USADA investigation into systematic doping.

On 10 July 2014, a UCI press release detailing various athlete sanctions specified that Menchov had been banned (for a period of two years) until 9 April 2015 due to adverse biological passport findings. Due to this, he has been disqualified from the 2009, 2010 and 2012 Tours de France.

Classification leadership and minor prizes

There were four main individual classifications contested in the 2009 Tour de France, as well as a team competition. The most important was the general classification, which was calculated by adding each rider's finishing times on each stage. There were no time bonuses given at the end of stages for this edition of the Tour. If a crash had happened within the final  of a stage, not including time trials and summit finishes, the riders involved would have received the same time as the group they were in when the crash occurred. The rider with the lowest cumulative time was the winner of the general classification and was considered the overall winner of the Tour. The rider leading the classification wore a yellow jersey.

The second classification was the points classification. Riders received points for finishing in the highest positions in a stage finish, or in intermediate sprints during the stage. The points available for each stage finish were determined by the stage's type. The leader was identified by a green jersey.

The third classification was the mountains classification. Most stages of the race included one or more categorised climbs, in which points were awarded to the riders that reached the summit first. The climbs were categorised as fourth-, third-, second- or first-category and hors catégorie, with the more difficult climbs rated lower. The leader wore a white jersey with red polka dots.

The final individual classification was the young rider classification. This was calculated the same way as the general classification, but the classification was restricted to riders who were born on or after 1 January 1984. The leader wore a white jersey.

The final classification was a team classification. This was calculated using the finishing times of the best three riders per team on each stage; the leading team was the team with the lowest cumulative time. The number of stage victories and placings per team determined the outcome of a tie. The riders in the team that lead this classification were identified with yellow number bibs on the back of their jerseys.

In addition, there was a combativity award given after each mass start stage to the rider considered, by a jury, to have "made the greatest effort and who has demonstrated the best qualities of sportsmanship". The winner wore a red number bib the following stage. At the conclusion of the Tour, Franco Pellizotti was given the overall super-combativity award.

There were also two special awards each with a prize of €5000, the Souvenir Henri Desgrange, given in honour of Tour founder and first race director Henri Desgrange to the first rider to pass the summit of the Col du Grand-Saint-Bernard on stage 16, and the Souvenir Jacques Goddet, given in honour of the second director Jacques Goddet to the first rider to pass the summit of the Col du Tourmalet on stage 9. Franco Pellizotti won both the Henri Desgrange and the Jacques Goddet.

 After stage 1, Fabian Cancellara was leading both the general and the points classifications. In stage 2, he wore the yellow jersey. Alberto Contador was placed second at the time in the green jersey points classification, but was the leader in the king of the mountains classification, and so forfeited the right to wear the green jersey. As a result, the third placed rider in the opening time trial, Bradley Wiggins wore the green jersey on stage 2.
 Stage 16 was originally won by Mikel Astarloza, who was found after the Tour to have tested positive for EPO before the race had started. The organisers have stripped him of the stage win, and former number two Sandy Casar became the official winner.

Final standings

General classification

Points classification

Mountains classification

Young rider classification

Team classification

World rankings
The following points were earned in the Tour towards the 2009 UCI World Ranking.

Notes

References

Bibliography

External links

 
 2009 Tour de France at Cyclingnews.com

 
Tour de France by year
Tour de France
Tour de France
Tour de France